Color Rhapsody is a series of usually one-shot animated cartoon shorts produced by Charles Mintz's studio Screen Gems for Columbia Pictures. They were launched in 1934, following the phenomenal success of Walt Disney's Technicolor Silly Symphonies and Warner Bros.' Merrie Melodies. Because of Disney's exclusive rights to the full three strip Technicolor process, Color Rhapsody were produced in the older two-tone Technicolor process until 1935, when Disney's exclusive contract expired.

The Color Rhapsody series is most notable for introducing the characters of The Fox and the Crow in the 1941 short The Fox and the Grapes. Two Color Rhapsody shorts, Holiday Land (1934) and The Little Match Girl (1937), were nominated for the Academy Award for Best Short Subject (Cartoons).

Filmography

1930s

1940s

Accolades

Notes

References

External links 
 

American animation anthology series
American animated short films
 
Columbia cartoons series and characters
Film series introduced in 1934
Screen Gems film series